Macy's (originally R. H. Macy & Co.) is an American chain of high-end department stores founded in 1858 by Rowland Hussey Macy. It became a division of the Cincinnati-based Federated Department Stores in 1994, through which it is affiliated with the Bloomingdale's department store chain; the holding company was renamed Macy's, Inc. in 2007. As of 2015, Macy's was the largest U.S. department store company by retail sales.

Macy's as of October 29, 2022, has 510 stores (569 boxes), inclusive of 445 department stores (499 boxes; includes 51 stores or 55 boxes that are neighborhood stores), 46 furniture galleries (51 boxes), 1 furniture clearance center, 9 freestanding Backstage stores, 7 Market by Macy's and 2 stores converted to fulfillment centers (there are a total of 506 full line stores and a total of 551 stores) with the Macy's nameplate in operation throughout the United States. Its flagship store is located at Herald Square in the New York City borough of Manhattan. The company had 130,000 employees and earned annual revenue of $24.8 billion as of 2017.

Macy's has conducted the annual Macy's Thanksgiving Day Parade in New York City since 1924 and has sponsored the city's annual Fourth of July fireworks display since 1976. Macy's Herald Square is one of the largest department stores in the world. The flagship store covers almost an entire New York City block, features about 1.1 million square feet of retail space, includes additional space for offices and storage, and serves as the endpoint for the Thanksgiving Day parade. The value of Herald Square alone is estimated at around $3 billion.

In August 2021, WHP Global announced that Toys "R" Us is opening 400+ stores within Macy's starting in 2022.

Early history

1800s

Rowland Hussey Macy opened four retail dry goods stores between 1843 and 1855. One of them was the original Macy's store in downtown Haverhill, Massachusetts; it opened in 1851 to serve the mill industry employees of the area. They all failed, but he learned from his mistakes. Macy moved to New York City in 1858, to establish a new store named "R. H. Macy & Co." on Sixth Avenue between 13th and 14th Streets. The location was far north of where other dry goods stores were at the time.  On the company's first day of business on October 28, 1858, sales totaled $11.08, equal to $ today. The branding emblem at the onset of the 1858 store was a rooster. The red star did not appear to replace it until 1862.

As the business grew, Macy's expanded into neighboring buildings, opening more and more departments. The store used publicity devices such as a store Santa Claus, themed exhibits, and illuminated window displays to draw in customers.  It also offered a money-back guarantee, although it accepted only cash into the 1950s. The store also produced its in-house made-to-measure clothing for both men and women, assembled in an on-site factory.

In 1875, Macy took on two partners, Robert M. Valentine (1850–1879), a nephew; and Abiel T. La Forge (1842–1878) of Wisconsin, who was the husband of a cousin. Macy died in 1877 from inflammatory kidney disease (then known as Bright's disease).  La Forge died the following year, and Valentine died in 1879. Ownership of the company remained in the Macy family until 1895, when the Straus brothers, Isidor and Nathan, acquired the company (now called "R. H. Macy & Co."). Isidor Straus and his brother Nathan Straus had previously held a license to sell china and other goods in the Macy's store.

1900s

Construction of Macy's Herald Square

In 1902, the flagship store moved uptown to Herald Square at 34th Street and Broadway, so far north of the other main dry goods emporia that it had to offer a steam wagonette to transport customers from 14th Street to 34th Street. Although the Herald Square store initially consisted of just one building, it expanded through new construction, eventually occupying almost the entire block bounded by Seventh Avenue on the west, Broadway on the east, 34th Street on the south and 35th Street on the north, with the exception of a small pre-existing building on the corner of 35th Street and Seventh Avenue and another on the corner of 34th Street and Broadway. This latter 5-story building was purchased by Robert H. Smith in 1900 for $375,000 (equivalent to $ in ) with the idea of getting in the way of Macy's becoming the largest store in the world: it is largely supposed that Smith, who was a neighbor of the Macy's store on 14th Street, was acting on behalf of Siegel-Cooper, which had built what they thought was the world's largest store on Sixth Avenue in 1896. Macy's ignored the tactic, and simply built around the building, which now carries Macy's "shopping bag" sign by lease arrangement. In 1912, Isidor Straus died in the sinking of the Titanic at the age of 67 with his wife, Ida.

The original Broadway store was designed by architects De Lemos & Cordes, was built in 1901–02 by the Fuller Company and has a Palladian facade, but has been updated in many details. There were further additions to the west in 1924 and 1928, and the Seventh Avenue building in 1931, all designed by architect Robert D. Kohn, the newer buildings were increasingly Art Deco in style. In 2012, Macy's began the first full renovation of the iconic Herald Square flagship store at a reported cost of $400 million. Studio V Architecture, a New York-based firm, was the overall Master Plan architect of the project. Studio V's design raised controversy over the nature of contemporary design and authentic restoration.

The building was added to the National Register of Historic Places as a National Historic Landmark in 1978.

National expansion

In the 1960s, Macy's built a store on Queens Boulevard in Elmhurst, in the New York City borough of Queens. This resulted in a round department store on 90 percent of the lot, with a small privately owned house on the corner. Macy's no longer fully occupies this building, which now contains the Queens Place Mall, with Macy's Furniture Gallery as a tenant; instead it moved its full outlet to the nearby Queens Center. 

More distant acquisitions included Lasalle & Koch (Toledo, 1924), Davison-Paxon-Stokes (Atlanta, 1929), L. Bamberger & Co. (Newark, 1929), O'Connor Moffat & Company (San Francisco, 1945) and John Taylor Dry Goods Co. (Kansas City, 1947). O'Connor Moffat was renamed Macy's San Francisco in 1947, later becoming Macy's California, and John Taylor was renamed Macy's Missouri-Kansas in 1949. Stores in Toledo retained the Lasalle's name until 1981, joining the Missouri-Kansas stores to become Macy's Midwest. The Toledo stores were sold to Elder-Beerman in 1986.

Macy's New York began opening stores outside of its historic New York City–Long Island trade area in 1983 with a location at Aventura Mall in Aventura, Florida (a suburb of Miami), followed by several locations in Plantation, Florida (now relocated from the Fashion Mall to the Broward Mall since the Burdines acquisition), Houston, New Orleans, and Dallas. Davison's in Atlanta was renamed Macy's Atlanta in early 1985 with the consolidation of an early incarnation of Macy's Midwest (former Taylor and Lasalle's stores in Kansas City and Toledo, respectively), but late in 1985, Macy's sold the former Midwest locations. Bamberger's, which had aggressively expanded throughout New Jersey, into the Greater Philadelphia Metropolitan area in the 1960s and 1970s as well as into Nanuet, New York (southern Rockland County), and into the Baltimore metropolitan area in the early 1980s, was renamed Macy's New Jersey in 1986.

History under Federated

1986–1993: Attempted buy-outs and bankruptcy
In 1986 Edward Finkelstein, Chairman & CEO of R. H. Macy & Co., Inc., led a leveraged buy-out of the company and subsequently engaged in a takeover battle for Federated Department Stores, Inc., in 1988 that he lost to Canada's Campeau Corporation. As part of its settlement with Campeau, Macy's purchased Federated's California-based, fashion-oriented Bullock's and its high-end Bullocks Wilshire and I. Magnin divisions. It followed with a reorganization of its divisions into Macy's Northeast (former Macy's New York and Macy's New Jersey), Macy's South/Bullock's (Macy's Atlanta stores plus Macy's New York's operations in Texas, Florida and Louisiana), and Macy's California, the latter including a semi-autonomous I. Magnin/Bullocks Wilshire organization. The Bullocks Wilshire stores were renamed I. Magnin in 1989. Subsequently, R. H. Macy & Co., Inc., filed for Chapter 11 bankruptcy protection on January 27, 1992, after which point its banks brought in a new management team, which shut several underperforming stores, jettisoned two-thirds of the luxury I. Magnin chain, and reduced Macy's to two divisions, Macy's East and Macy's West.

Macy's East, New York City was a division of Macy's, Inc. It is the operating successor to the original R.H. Macy & Co., Inc. and operates the Macy's department stores in the northeast U.S. and Puerto Rico. Over the years it has been known as Macy's New York and Macy's Northeast. On February 1, 2006, Macy's East assumed operating control over the Filene's, Strawbridge's, many of the Kaufmann's stores in upstate New York and the Hecht's stores in Pennsylvania, Maryland, D.C. and northern Virginia. These locations assumed the Macy's moniker officially on September 9, 2006. In 2008 Macy's East took over the small Macy's North division.

In May 1993, Macy's announced the planned fall 1994 launch of TV Macy's, the retailer's own home shopping channel, in conjunction with Don Hewitt, Thomas Leahy and Cablevision.

1994–2005: Acquisition by Federated

R. H. Macy & Co. merged with Federated Department Stores on December 19, 1994. Following the merger, the reorganized Macy's moved its headquarters to Cincinnati, Ohio. Federated promptly shut down the remainder of the I. Magnin chain, converting several to Macy's or Bullock's and selling four in Carmel, Beverly Hills, San Diego and Phoenix to Saks Fifth Avenue. Federated also merged its Abraham & Straus/Jordan Marsh division with the new "Macy's East" organization based in New York, renaming the Abraham & Straus stores in metropolitan New York with the Macy's nameplate in 1995, and then erasing the Jordan Marsh moniker in New England in early 1996.

Federated followed that by leading a bid in mid-1995 to acquire the bankrupt Woodward & Lothrop/John Wanamaker organization in the mid-Atlantic region, a bid it lost to a rival group led by long-time rival and future acquisition target The May Department Stores Company. Instead Federated soon agreed to purchase Broadway Stores, Inc. (owner of The Broadway, Emporium and Weinstock's stores in California, Arizona, Nevada and New Mexico), from its majority shareholder, Sam Zell, thereby gaining a leading position in Southern California and a dominant one in the Northern California marketplace. In early 1996 Federated dissolved Broadway Stores, incorporating the majority of its locations into Macy's West, rebadging them as Macy's and using the opportunity to retire the Bullock's name. Several of the redundant Broadway locations were used to establish Bloomingdale's on the West Coast, while many others were sold to Sears.

In 2001 Federated dissolved its Stern's division in the New York metropolitan area, with the bulk of the stores being absorbed into Macy's East. Additionally, in July 2001 it acquired the Liberty House chain with department and specialty stores in Hawaii and Guam, consolidating it with Macy's West.

In early 2003 Federated closed the majority of its historic Davison's franchise in Atlanta (operating as Macy's since 1985), rebranding its other Atlanta division Rich's with the unwieldy name, Rich's–Macy's. The downtown location – formerly the Davison's flagship store at 180 Peachtree Street – was shuttered at this time as well. The original Macy's Lenox Square and Perimeter Mall locations were extensively remodeled and opened in October 2003 as the first Bloomingdale's stores in Atlanta. The company rapidly followed suit in May 2003 with similar rebranding announcements for its other nameplates, Burdines in Florida, Goldsmith's in Memphis, Lazarus in the lower Midwest, and The Bon Marché in the Pacific Northwest.

On March 6, 2005, the Bon-Macy's, Burdines-Macy's, Goldsmith's-Macy's, Lazarus-Macy's, and Rich's–Macy's stores were renamed as simply "Macy's", the first two as the new Macy's West and Macy's Florida divisions respectively and the later three as part of the Macy's Central division. As of July 2005, Macy's had 424 stores throughout the U.S.

2005–2006: Effects of Federated–May merger

On February 28, 2005, Federated agreed to terms of a deal to acquire The May Department Stores Company for $11 billion (equivalent to $ in ) in stock, creating the nation's second largest department store chain with $30 billion (equivalent to $ in ) in annual sales and more than 1,000 stores.

On July 28, 2005, Federated announced, based on the success of converting its own regional brands to the Macy's name, its plans to similarly convert 330 regional department stores owned by the May Company (as May Department Stores was generally referred to) to the Macy's nameplate. This included May's Marshall Field's (which had just been purchased by the May Company from Target in 2004), Kaufmann's, Famous-Barr, Filene's, Foley's, Hecht's, The Jones Store, L. S. Ayres, Meier & Frank, Robinsons-May, and Strawbridge & Clothier chains, pending approval of the merger by federal regulators.

The rebranding of the May stores was disliked in Chicago and elsewhere because the stores were regarded as beloved local institutions. The renaming of Filene's, Marshall Field's, and Kaufmann's, which were well known for their downtown flagship stores and local traditions provoked the most outrage. For example, Kaufmann's operated the Kaufmann's Celebrate the Season Parade which was traditionally broadcast live throughout the Commonwealth of Pennsylvania on television. Many customers publicly vowed to never again shop at the renamed May stores and to switch to competitors. Prominent film critic Roger Ebert voiced the grief of many Chicagoans at the loss of Field's when he wrote in his column on September 21, 2005:

On January 12, 2006, Federated announced its plans to divest May Company's Lord & Taylor division by the end of 2006 before converting and closing seven stores. On June 22, 2006, Macy's announced that NDRC Equity Partners, LLC would purchase Lord & Taylor for US$1.2 billion (equivalent to $ in ), and completed the sale in October 2006.

By September 9, 2006, after renaming the former May Company stores, Macy's operated approximately 850 stores in the United States. To promote its largest and most recent expansion, Macy's used a version of the Martha and the Vandellas hit song, "Dancing in the Street", in its advertising. Also, the company took props from its annual Thanksgiving Day parade to various re-labeled stores throughout the nation, in what the company marketed as its "Parade on Parade".

In October 2006, Federated Department Stores entered into an agreement with Zoom Systems to test more than 100 stores within retail giant Macy's. Terry Lundgren, CEO of Federated, raved about the ability to provide consumers with a convenient means to purchase iPods and other consumer electronics, saying "This is exciting because it brings most-wanted merchandise into stores in a unique new way.... How cool is that?" Today, Macy's has converted its entire Electronics section in every store to (over 400) eSpot ZoomShops.

Current operations under Macy's, Inc.

2007–2014

Macy's significantly increased its use of television advertising and product placement in 2006 and 2007, using branding spots that featured the new Macy's star logo. Macy's television commercials are produced primarily by New York Production Services, a New York-based commercial and independent film production company. During two episodes of the popular ABC television series Desperate Housewives ("I Remember That" and "Now You Know"), a Macy's location in the fictional city of Fairview was featured, rare instances of product placement promoting a department store chain in a scripted series. Nearly two years prior to the first episode, one of the first national commercials for Macy's had aired during Desperate Housewives, shortly after the conversions of Rich's, Lazarus, Goldsmith's, The Bon Marché and Burdines.

On February 27, 2007, Federated Department Stores announced plans to change its corporate name to Macy's Group, Inc.  By March 28, the company further announced plans to convert its stock ticker symbol from "FD" to "M", and revised its name change to Macy's, Inc.  The change in corporate names was approved by shareholders on May 18, 2007, and took effect on June 1, 2007. The company continues to operate stores under the Macy's and Bloomingdale's nameplates.

In March 2009, Macy's opened a one-level,  concept store in Gilbert, Arizona, a Phoenix suburb, that was designed to better fit open air lifestyle malls.  Additional stores with the new format have opened in Fairview, Texas; Lee's Summit, Missouri; and Nampa, Idaho.  The stores are designed to be compact and meet current demands for more convenient shopping similar to Kohl's and newer J. C. Penney stores.  Lifestyle stores feature Starbucks Coffee Cafés with wireless web and fitting rooms designed to feel like lounges with sofas and Plasma TVs. Ceilings in the center areas are higher to be reminiscent of older department stores. The format was the culmination of 18 months of research to create stores for the "My Macy's" initiative that allows stores to be merchandised differently in markets across the country to meet local demands.

On October 28, 2014 Macy's, Inc. announced an extension of the lease-operation agreement with Al Tayer Group LLC that would bring the first Macy's store overseas to Abu Dhabi, anchoring a new mall with its corporate-sister Bloomingdale's, which will open its second overseas store (the first was located at The Dubai Mall); both are slated to open in 2018.  Macy's was the 15th-largest retailer in the United States for 2014 by revenue.

2015–present

In January 2015, it was announced that Macy's would close 14 stores nationwide and shift 830 workers from Macy's and Bloomingdale's stores. Unrelated to the store closings, on July 13, 2015 Macy's announced it had sold the former flagship store of Kaufmann's in Downtown Pittsburgh for redevelopment, closing the location after 128 years.

In May 2015, Macy's joined the new American Express-backed Plenti rewards card, which it shares with AT&T Mobility, Direct Energy, Enterprise Rent-A-Car, ExxonMobil, Hulu, Nationwide Insurance, and Rite Aid.

On September 9, 2015, Macy's announced it would close 35 to 40 under-performing stores by early 2016. The retailer's struggles continued into the holiday season in 2015. The company announced that it experienced same store sales declines of 5.2% in November and December 2015 – typically busy months. In January 2016, Macy's announced that it will layoff up to 4,800 employees. The company said that these closings would experience cost savings of $400 million. As of January 2016, Macy's had 770 stores in total.

On August 11, 2016, Macy's announced that it would close 100 stores in early 2017, expecting to save $550 million a year and cut more than 10,000 jobs. Macy's claimed  it would instead invest $250 million in digital business and growth strategies for the remaining stores. By January 2018, Macy's had revealed the locations of 81 of the 100 store closures.

In September 2016, Macy's announced that it would be opening an Apple Store in its flagship location, making it the first department store to host an Apple store. The announcement came after six straight quarters of sales drops and significant store closings. In early January 2017, the value of Macy's shares fell 14%, its biggest drop in seven months.
In February 2017, the Hudson's Bay Company made an overture to Macy's for a potential takeover of the struggling department store.

Macy's acquired experiential concept Story in May 2018 and made a minority investment in b8ta, a retail as a service concept, in June 2018.

By February 2019, Macy's Inc. was operating 867 stores, including Macy's, Backstage, Bloomingdale's, Bloomingdale's Outlets, Bluemercury, and STORY; 641 of the 867 stores were Macy's, including 584 that are full line and 57 that are home, furniture, clearance and specialty stores.

In November 2018, Macy's announced they would test smaller "neighborhood" stores to reduce costs and promote innovation within the customer experience realm.
As of 2018, Macy's ranked 120 on the Fortune 500 list of the largest United States corporations by revenue. Gennette has also launched an overhaul of Macy's stores called the Growth150 strategic plan.

In the second quarter of 2019, Macy's shares fell more than 13 percent. On August 14, shares hit $15.82, which was their lowest since February 2010.

After conducting two years of research, Macy's announced in 2019 that it intended to ban the sale of fur products at its stores by the end of the 2020 fiscal year. The news follows the state of California's ban on the manufacturing and sale of such items.

In 2020, Macy's closed its Cincinnati headquarters, consolidating headquarters operations in New York City. JANA Partners, an activist investment firm, disclosed a large stake in Macy's in 2021, and sent a letter to the board recommending spinning off the company's online business. In response, Macy's hired AlixPartners to review their business structure. By the end of 2021, JANA had reduced their holding in Macy's by 84%, or about 1.5% of the company.

In August 2021, Macy's announced they were partnering with Toys "R" Us to open toy shops in Macy's stores, starting in 2022. In November 2021, Macy's announced they were starting a free education program and boosting its corporation base salary to $15 per hour.

In February 2023, Macy's said they would no longer sell leather goods made of exotic skins, such as reptiles or ostriches.

Nameplates

Current

 Macy's – chain of department stores usually located in shopping malls; in properties that have multiple Macy's locations, the second stores are often arranged in the following department configurations:
 Women and Children
 Furniture Clearance
 Furniture Gallery
 Furniture and Kids
 Furniture and Men's
 Furniture, Home, Kids, and Men's
 Furniture, Home, and Men's
 Furniture, Kids, and Men's
 Home, Kids, and Men's
 Home, Kids, and Women's
 Home and Men's
 Kids and Men's
 Men’s
 Macy's Backstage – chain of off-price stores-within-stores located inside 302 full-line Macy's department stores, with 9 freestanding locations. Some brands sold in Macy's Backstage stores are not or no longer sold by full line Macy's stores, such as PVH's Izod and Arrow brands, and Ralph Lauren Corporation's Chaps brand.

Former
The nameplates of regional department stores were usually replaced entirely by the Macy's brand upon acquisition, with the exception of some chains that were co-branded before eventually being replaced by Macy's completely:

Criticism and controversy
In July 2003, then-New York State Attorney General Eliot Spitzer launched an investigation of the private policing system Macy's has used to deal with suspected shoplifters. The investigation was prompted by a civil rights lawsuit and an article in The New York Times, which reported on many of Macy's tactics, including private jails and interrogations. Spitzer's investigation found many of Macy's actions, from ethnic profiling to handcuffing detainees, to be unlawful. In 2005, Macy's settled the civil rights complaint for $600,000 (equivalent to $ in ), claiming to have put the illegal tactics to an end while maintaining the security system itself.

On June 6, 2006, Macy's downtown Boston store (formerly the Jordan Marsh flagship) removed two mannequins and the Web address of the AIDS Action Committee from a window display promoting Boston's annual gay pride celebration. The removal was apparently in response to pressure from MassResistance, a local group opposed to same-sex marriage, whose members complained the mannequins were "homosexual". The removal of the mannequins was controversial and Boston mayor Thomas Menino was quoted as saying:

Macy's responded by publishing an apology by the Macy's East chairman, Ron Klein, in In Newsweekly, a Boston-area weekly with a large gay readership. Klein's description of the incident as "an internal breakdown in communication", further stated it was regrettable some would doubt Macy's commitment to diversity as a result.  The Web address was later restored – the mannequins, however, never made a reappearance.

See also
 List of department stores of the United States
 Aeropostale

References

External links

 
 The Romance of a Great Store by Edward Hungerford
 Straus Historical Society

Clothing retailers of the United States
Companies based in Cincinnati
Companies that filed for Chapter 11 bankruptcy in 1992
Department stores of the United States
 
Midtown Manhattan
Retail companies established in 1858
Shops in New York City
1858 establishments in New York (state)
Economy of New York City
Furniture retailers of the United Kingdom
Toys "R" Us